The Chrysler Firepower was a Dodge Viper-based concept car produced in 2005. It takes some of the styling cues from the Chrysler Crossfire. According to Chrysler, its 6.1 L Hemi V8 engine produced  and could propel the vehicle to a 0-60 mph time of 4.5 seconds and has a top speed of 174 mph. The concept was once featured on the cover of Car and Driver.

Designers responsible for the design were Brian Nielander (exterior), who also worked on the ME-412 concept; and Greg Howell (interior).

Plans for production 
The Firepower Concept was built to prove that Chrysler could indeed build a hybrid car using existing hardware. Signs early in 2006 pointed to the Firepower going into production using the same hardware as the concept, but later that year Chrysler officially announced that the Firepower would not be produced, as they could not find a viable way of doing so.

Gallery

References

See also 
 "Chrysler gives us a look at Firepower Concept"

Firepower